Park Lane Stables are stables in Teddington, London Borough of Richmond upon Thames built around 1830 and originally conceived as a fire station when fire engines were horse drawn. Today the stables are run as a charity belonging to the Riding for the Disabled Association.

History

19th century 
The stables were built to house a fire station around 1830 by the Abbot of Westminster in what was then known as Alms House Road, on account of the almshouses in the street opposite the stables.

In 1831 a parish fire engine was purchased and put in the care of the beadle, a caretaker employed by the Abbot of Westminster. In 1837 the Abbot gave up the land and ownership turned to the local civic parish council.

20th century 
In the 1901 census the stables are described as 'Council Stables, Engine House [and] Council Yard', belonging to the civil parish.

In 1950 Keith Luxford leased the stables from the council to start a riding school which became known locally as the 'Children's Riding School'. In the late 1950s the stables were taken over by Peter Churchill who ran horsemanship night courses and a riding school. By 1963 the stables were run by John Quinn. In 1989 ownership passed to Mr and Mrs P Dailly who continued to operate the riding school as 'Park Lane Stables'.

21st century 
As a result of foot and mouth disease in 2001 and the closure of local parks, the stables were forced to shut; they remained so until 2008 when Natalie O'Rourke MBE  took over management and subsequently founded Park Lane Stables RDA as a registered charity. In 2016 after refurbishment HRH Princess Anne re-opened the stables in her capacity as RDA president. Mid 2021 the stables were classed as an 'Asset of Community Value' by the London Borough of Richmond upon Thames and in November 2021 as a 'Building of Townscape Merit', affording it further protection from development.

Campaign to save the stables 
In the beginning of 2021 the stables faced closure due to the landlord wishing to sell the property. A community effort raised over £1 million to purchase the building via crowd funding, and the purchase was completed in late 2021.

References 

Teddington